Waldemar Chaves de Araújo (born in Bom Despacho, state of Minas Gerais on June 23, 1934) is the bishop emeritus of the Roman Catholic Diocese of São João del Rei.
He was bishop from 1996 to 2010, when he retired.

References

Brazilian bishops

Catholic bishops in Brazil

1934 births

Living people